Michael Rady (born August 20, 1981) is an American actor.

Career
Rady made his acting debut in the feature film The Sisterhood of the Traveling Pants, playing Kostas Dounas, a role he reprised in the sequel, The Sisterhood of the Traveling Pants 2. He has appeared in other feature films with small parts including The Guardian. Rady also starred in the independent film InSearchOf.

Rady had a recurring role in the CBS summer series, Swingtown, playing philosophy teacher Doug Stephens. He appeared in the second season of Showtime's TV drama Sleeper Cell. Rady appeared as a guest star in two seasons of the ABC Family series Greek playing the Honors Polymer Science major and Honors Engineering Floor Resident Advisor Max Tyler. 
In 2009, he was cast in The CW series Melrose Place as Jonah Miller, an aspiring filmmaker. Since 2014, he has appeared in a number of made-for-television movies airing on the Hallmark Channel.

Personal life
Rady was born in Philadelphia, Pennsylvania, on August 20, 1981. Rady married Rachael Kemery and they have four children: two sons, Ellington born in 2012 and August born in 2014, and two daughters, Olive born in 2016 and Maisie Iris born in 2021. Rady is a vegan.

Filmography

References

External links

1981 births
Living people
Male actors from Philadelphia
American male television actors
American people of Italian descent
21st-century American male actors
American male film actors
St. Joseph's Preparatory School alumni